VE9EC was a Canadian experimental television station, based in Montreal, Quebec, which broadcast between October 9, 1931 and 1935, showing neon red pictures. It was owned by La Presse and CKAC radio station. VE9EC was a mechanical television broadcast of 60 to 150 lines of resolution at 41 MHz. VE9EC broadcast musical programmes and a radio play, La paix chez soi, starring Henri Letondal, until 1933. Other broadcasting experiments with mechanical television took place, in particular by the Montreal department store Eaton's also in 1933.

References 

Defunct television stations in Canada
Experimental television stations
Television channels and stations established in 1931
1931 establishments in Quebec
1935 disestablishments in Canada
Television stations in Montreal
Television channels and stations disestablished in 1935
Defunct mass media in Quebec